The Isaac Newton Telescope or INT is a 2.54 m (100 in) optical telescope run by the Isaac Newton Group of Telescopes at Roque de los Muchachos Observatory on La Palma in the Canary Islands since 1984.

Originally the INT was situated at Herstmonceux Castle in Sussex, England, which was the site of the Royal Greenwich Observatory after it moved away from Greenwich due to light pollution. It was inaugurated in 1967 by Queen Elizabeth II.

Herstmonceux suffered from poor weather, and the advent of mass air travel made it plausible for UK astronomers to run an overseas observatory. In 1979, the INT was shipped to La Palma, where it has remained ever since. It saw its second first light in 1984, with a video camera. A major change was the mirror was now made of the new type Zerodur glass, as compared to the old mirror's Pyrex glass.

Today, it is used mostly with the Wide Field Camera (WFC), a four CCD instrument with a field of view of 0.56×0.56 square degrees which was commissioned in 1997. The other main instrument available at the INT is the intermediate dispersion spectrograph (IDS), recently re-introduced, having been unavailable for a period of several years.

The old site of the INT is now the Observatory Science Center at Herstmonceux, and it is known for its distinctive greened copper dome and various science and astronomy activities.

Summary Background up to 1979

The United States gifted a 98-inch mirror in 1949 to the United Kingdom. (In a telescope this could establish the 3rd largest in the World, behind only the Hale and Hooker telescopes at that time). After ten years the mount was ordered for the telescope, and in 1959 construction began on what would be the INT, and it was completed by 1965; first light at Herstmonceux was conducted that year.

The mirror was ground by Grubb in the 1950s, although until 1956, according to Observatories and Telescopes of Modern Times, there was some consideration for buying a new 74-inch from Grubb. The Royal Greenwich Observatory completed its move to Herstmonceux in 1956.

A short film was published in 1956 that featured the grinding of the 98-inch mirror blank for the Isaac Newton Telescope by Grubb Parsons. (reflecting telescopes of this type need the glass blank ground into a precise shape, which can take years)

The telescope's first light (first, first light) occurred in 1965, and was dedicated in 1967.

On December 1, 1967, the Isaac Newton Telescope of the Royal Greenwich Observatory at Herstmonceux was inaugurated (dedicated) by Queen Elizabeth II. One of the accomplishments with the telescope was the observations of Cygnus X-1.

In the late 1960s, a concept was developed for a Northern Hemisphere Observatory, that culminated in the project for an international observatory in the Canary Islands; Mauna Kea in Hawaii was also considered for the location. Although the telescope itself was acquitting itself, the weather at the site less so. This eventually led to the plan to move the telescope to a new observatory, which would occur in the next decade and into the early 1980s.

The 'last light' for original Isaac Newton Telescope was in May 1979.  The new telescope for the island had so many new parts however, it was deemed possible in the mid-1980s to essentially fork the telescope design into two working telescopes with some rejuvenation. This would mean having another functioning telescope at Sussex, however this project was terminated.One issue is that it would mean operating two telescopes, and the focus at that time had shifted to operating the new INT on the island. The old site would eventually be turned into a science museum with much of the old telescopes left as they were.

The old observatory buildings remain by the Castle, and it is the site of the Herstmonceux Science Center (aka Observatory Science Center at Herstmonceux).

During construction in 1983, a Spanish container ship carrying parts of the telescope to La Palma was involved in an aircraft incident. In what is known as the Alraigo incident, a British Royal Navy Sea Harrier fighter jet made an emergency landing on the base plate for the observatory.

Technical detail since 1984
The La Palma INT is a Cassegrain telescope, with a 2.54 m (100 in) diameter primary mirror and a focal length of 8.36 m (329 in). The mirror weighs 4361 kg (9614 lb), and is supported by a polar disc/fork type equatorial mounting. The total weight of the telescope is around 90 tons. The f/3.29 Prime focus, used with the WFC, allows an unvignetted field of view of 40 arcminutes (approximately 0.3 square degrees). There is also a secondary focal station, the f/15 Cassegrain focus, which possesses a 20 arcminute field of view and is the mount point for the IDS. The telescopes second first light was done by video.

The new 100 inch Zerodur-glass mirror arrived at La Palma in December 1982.

The pointing accuracy of the telescope is around 5 arcseconds, but a sophisticated autoguider, which tracks a given guide star and makes small corrections to the telescope tracking, allows a guiding accuracy of better than an arcsecond on better than 20th magnitude guide stars in support of the typical 0.8–1.5 arcsec seeing at the INT.

Contemporaries
The Isaac Newton Telescope was a very large telescope for its day, and the largest in England. It was a little smaller in aperture than the 100-inch Hooker telescope in the United States, but much newer. It originally had a 98-inch mirror when in England, but was given a new, larger 100-inch mirror by Grubb Parsons after the move.

1967
The INT was inaugurated by Queen Elizabeth II in 1967. The largest optical telescopes in 1967 included:

1984
INT began its new life atop the Spanish island of La Palma in the Canary Islands in 1984, with a new mirror and dome. Large visible-light optical ground telescopes in 1984 included:

HARPS3

The High Accuracy Radial velocity Planet Searcher 3 (HARPS3) is a high resolution Echelle-type spectrograph that will be installed onto the telescope and aims to start observations in 2024. It is being built as part of the Terra Hunting Experiment - a future 10 year radial velocity measurement program to discover Earth-like exoplanets. It has a goal to achieve 10 cm/s radial velocity precision.

See also 
 Isaac Newton
 Newton's reflector (a reflector made by Isaac Newton in the 1600s)
 Newtonian telescope (a telescope design)
 International Year of Astronomy commemorative coin
 The INT Photometric H-Alpha Survey (IPHAS), an astronomical survey of the northern plane of our Galaxy by this telescope

References

External links
 INT Homepage
 
Stock Photo of old 98 inch mirror at  Herstmonceux Science Center
INT article (2012)

Optical telescopes
Astronomical observatories in La Palma
1967 establishments in Spain